Minor Jesús Álvarez Cordero, known as Minor Álvarez (born 14 November 1989) is a Costa Rican professional footballer who plays as a goalkeeper for Liga Nacional club Cobán Imperial.

Club career
Álvarez played for Saprissa and had loan spells at Belén Siglo XXI and Santos de Guápiles. In January 2013, Álvarez moved abroad and signed a 5-year contract with Guatemalan side Xelajú but a surplus in foreigners forced him to be loaned out to Aurora. He received Guatemalan citizenship in September 2013 and joined Malacateco in January 2014.

International career
He was included in the Costa Rica national football team for the 2011 Copa América, but did not play at all in the tournament.

He made his debut on 10 October 2020 in a friendly match against Panama.

Honours
Cobán Imperial 
Liga Nacional de Guatemala: Apertura 2022

References

1989 births
Living people
Naturalized citizens of Guatemala
Association football goalkeepers
Costa Rican footballers
Costa Rica international footballers
2011 Copa América players
Deportivo Saprissa players
Belén F.C. players
Santos de Guápiles footballers
Xelajú MC players
Aurora F.C. players
C.D. Malacateco players
Costa Rican expatriate footballers
Expatriate footballers in Guatemala
Costa Rican emigrants to Guatemala
Liga FPD players